Vitor Borges de Souza (born 13 July 1988, in Brazil) is a Brazilian footballer who plays for KajHa in Finland as of 2017.

Career

Singapore

Moving to Balestier Khalsa of the Singaporean S.League in 2010, Borges re-joined the club in 2011 after they released him.

Succeeding his stint with PSIS Semarang, Balestier Khalsa purchased the Brazilian again in 2013.

Indonesia

Due to Borges not scoring goals, the PSIS Semarang management paid him less, causing supporters to give donations.

Involved in a 2013 car accident in Indonesia, the forward was listed as a suspect but there was not enough information to substantiate a charge.

Finland

Arriving at KajHa in 2017, Borges tallied three goals in his first three appearances for the club.

References

External links 

 Hougang linked with Vitor
 Tigers add Brazilians to their ranks
 at Soccerway
 at ZeroZero
 at Footballdatabase.eu

Association football forwards
Brazilian footballers
Expatriate footballers in Singapore
Expatriate footballers in Indonesia
Oulun Palloseura players
Balestier Khalsa FC players
Living people
1988 births
Brazilian expatriate footballers
PSIS Semarang players
Expatriate footballers in Finland
Hougang United FC players
Singapore Premier League players
Kajaanin Haka players